Globus Cassus is an art project and book by Swiss architect and artist Christian Waldvogel presenting a conceptual transformation of planet Earth into a much bigger, hollow, artificial world with an ecosphere on its inner surface. It was the Swiss contribution to the 2004 Venice Architecture Biennale and was awarded the gold medal in the category "Most beautiful books of the World" at the Leipzig Book Fair in 2005. It consists of a meticulous description of the transformation process, a narrative of its construction, and suggestions on the organizational workings on Globus Cassus.

Waldvogel described it as an "open source" art project and stated that anyone could contribute designs and narratives to it on the project wiki. As of August 2012, the Globus Cassus wiki is no longer operational.

Properties

The proposed megastructure would incorporate all of Earth's matter. Sunlight would enter through two large windows, and gravity would be simulated by the centrifugal effect. Humans would live on two vast regions that face each other and that are connected through the empty center. The hydrosphere and atmosphere would be retained on its inside. The ecosphere would be restricted to the equatorial zones, while at the low-gravity tropic zones a thin atmosphere would allow only for plantations. The polar regions would have neither gravity nor atmosphere and would therefore be used for storage of raw materials and microgravity production processes.

Geometric structure
Globus Cassus has the form of a compressed geodesic icosahedron with two diagonal openings. Along the edges of the icosahedron run the skeleton beams, the gaps between the beams contain a shell and, where there are windows, inward-curving domes.

Building material
Earth's crust, mantle and core are gradually excavated, transported outwards and then transformed to larger strength and reduced density. While the crust is mined from open pits in the continents' centers, magma and the liquid mantle are pumped across transfer hoses. The core is dismantled from the surface.

Planetary scale
Since the stationary cables would stay clear inside the moon's trajectory, the construction of Globus Cassus would not alter the Earth-Moon system. However, on a planetary scale the proportions would be altered, with Globus Cassus being only slightly smaller than Saturn, the Solar System's second-largest planet.

Construction process
Starting at four precisely defined points in the geostationary orbit, four space elevators are built. Eventually they become massive towers, each measuring several hundred kilometers in diameter and extending to a length of about 165,000 km. The towers contain elevators which are used to transport silicate building material to the construction sites at geostationary orbit.

Skeleton and shell
The building material is converted into vacuum-porous aggregate and used to form the skeleton. It is built retaining constant symmetry and balance at every moment and will ultimately span around all sides of the earth. Then magma is pumped towards the skeleton, where it is used to form thin shells in the skeletal openings. Eight of these openings are fitted with large, inward-curving window domes made out of silicon glass.

The Great Rains
Having been used up to a large degree, the Earth has shrunk, the polar ice caps have melted and the Earth's mass and therefore gravity has declined. This leads to the sudden loss of the atmosphere and hydrosphere, which wander outwards towards the new World. Globus Cassus' equator zones are equipped with a system of trenches and moulds that will become rivers, lakes and seas as soon as the water has settled. The transfer process of atmosphere and hydrosphere is called "The Great Rains".

Colonization
The moment the Great Rains start, the Earth becomes uninhabitable. Along with massive amounts of seed for all existing plants, the regions of high cultural value, that need to be conserved and reapplied on Globus Cassus have been stored in the skeleton nodes which touch the towers. Humans and animals rise in the towers to await the end of the rains and start settling on the two equator regions.

Plant growth
The remaining Earth core is dismantled to build the shells that lie in the pole regions. During this process, the massive heat radiation of the core accelerates plant growth and therefore aids the process of establishing a functioning biosphere.

See also

Literature

Globus Cassus, Lars Müller Publishers, with contributions by Boris Groys, Claude Lichtenstein, Michael Stauffer and Christian Waldvogel. Awarded the gold medal in international competition "Best designed books from all over the World 2004",

References

External links
 Globus Cassus addon for Celestia
 9th international architecture exhibition in venice, italy, 2004 / swiss pavilion: ‘larger earth’, by Christian Waldvogel
 Damn Interesting review of Globus Cassus

Fictional planets
Megastructures
Planetary engineering
Space colonization
Conceptual art
2004 in science